Abbo II of Metz was the thirty-fifth bishop of the Diocese of Metz, following Landry of Metz. He is commemorated with a feast day of 15 April.

Abbo served as bishop from 697–707.

References

Sources
 Holweck, F. G., A Biographical Dictionary of the Saints. St. Louis, MO: B. Herder Book Co., 1924.

7th-century births
8th-century deaths
Bishops of Metz
7th-century Frankish bishops
8th-century Frankish bishops
8th-century Frankish saints